The 2020 World Series of Poker (WSOP) was the 51st edition of the event. Originally scheduled to begin on May 26 at the Rio All-Suite Hotel and Casino in Las Vegas, Nevada, it was postponed due to the COVID-19 pandemic.

There were 101 bracelet events on the schedule before the postponement. 

In June, the WSOP introduced the 2020 World Series of Poker Online, a series of 85 online tournaments, 31 on WSOP.com and 54 on GGPoker. The series started on July 1 and concluded in September.

In November, the WSOP announced that the $10,000 No Limit Hold'em Main Event would still be held, but in a different format. Play began online, with international players starting November 29 on GGPoker and American players December 13 on WSOP.com. Once both tournaments reached the final nine players, a final table was held live—December 15 at King's Casino in Rozvadov, Czech Republic for international players, and December 28 at the Rio for American players. The winners of both final tables then met in a heads-up match at the Rio on January 3 to determine the champion.

Main Event

The $10,000 No Limit Hold'em Main Event began on November 29 with the first of three starting flights on GGPoker. The surviving players from each flight combined for Day 2 on December 7 and played down to a final table of nine. The final table was held on December 15 at King's Casino in Rozvadov, Czech Republic.

For American players, the event began on December 13 on WSOP.com, with the final table taking place on December 28.

The Main Event on GGPoker attracted 674 players, creating a prize pool of $6,470,400. The top 80 players made the money, with the winner earning $1,550,969.

The WSOP.com Main Event had 705 entries and a prize pool of $6,768.000. The top 107 players made the money, with a first place prize of $1,553,256. In addition, the champion of the heads-up match between the GGPoker and WSOP.com winners earned $1 million. The match was originally scheduled to take place on December 30 but was moved to January 3 after Damian Salas, winner of the Rozvadov final table, was denied entry into the United States.

Combined, the 2020 Main Event attracted 1,379 players.

Performance of past champions

*- Denotes player who finished in the money

Final Tables

*- Career statistics prior to the 2020 Main Event

Final Tables results

*- Sun did not travel to Rozvadov for the final table and was awarded ninth place
**- De Silva was disqualified after testing positive for COVID-19 and awarded ninth place

Heads-up Championship Match results

References

External links
Official website

World Series of Poker
World Series of Poker
World Series of Poker
World Series of Poker